Dmitry Bogachev (born April 11, 1969, Minsk) — Theater producer, CEO of the theatre company "Moscow Broadway LLC", founder of the Russian division of the international live entertainment company Stage Entertainment, member of The Broadway League, initiator of the Broadway business model in Russian theatre.

Education 
 1985 — Diploma with distinction in music
 1995 — Moscow Engineering Physics Institute —  Master's degree in physics
 2002 — The British Council, Soros Foundation and Ford Foundation — Diploma in theater management

Career 
1994–1997 — Junior scientist of The Lab of Electronic Microscopy and Structure Investigations, the Russian Scientific Center Kurchatov Institute.

1997–2000 — Producer, CEO of IVC producing and recording company.

1998–2000 — executive producer of a popular music project "Songs Of Our Century". Music albums released under the label ranked at the top positions in national sales charts. "Songs of our century" tours covered the territories of Russia, Europe, Israel, USA and Canada.

2000–2002 — worked as a member of the producing team on Nord-Ost the Musical. As commercial director created and implemented the unique marketing strategy and commercial plan for the first Russian musical to run daily, Nord-Ost.

2001–2003 — was one of the initiators and pioneers of the development and implementation of computerized ticketing in Russia

2003 — founded and headed the production company "Russian Musical", which produced musical "12 chairs". The stage version ran in Moscow for a year; a touring version performed in St. Petersburg.

November 2004 — Founded Stage Entertainment Russia — subsidiary of the largest theater company Stage Entertainment. Since then under the leadership of Dmitry Bogachev as Managing Director and producer, Stage Entertainment Russia has produced many successful musicals and ice-skating musicals, which have been visited by over 10 million people. Since 2005, Stage Entertainment Russia has been producing world-famous musical productions at MDM Theatre.

In 2011, Dmitry Bogachev conceived musical Anastasia based on the 1997 animated feature of 1997 and the 20th Century Fox motion picture of 1956, as well as historical events and documents. Being the author of original idea of stage musical ANASTASIA, he developed the creative concept and invited the composer Stephen Flaherty, the lyricist Lynn Ahrens and the playwright Terrence McNally to create a musical play. The  first readings of the play  took place at the New 42nd Street Studios on Broadway in July, 2012. The cast of the readings included Angela Lansbury, Aaron Tveit, Kelli Barrett, Patrick Page, Aaron Lazar and Julie Hamilton.

In 2012 — under the leadership of Dmitry Bogachev Stage Entertainment Russia transformed the largest Russian cinema venue Pushkinskiy, located in the heart of Moscow into a musical theater, reinstating its historical name Rossiya Theatre. Since then Stage Entertainment became the largest theater company in Russia, its musical productions presented 8 times a week at two theaters — Rossiya and MDM.

In 2012 — Dmitry Bogachev started a new non-profit project "Moscow Broadway" — an educational program aiming to develop the genre of musical theatre in Russia; support creative and administrative theater professionals in acquisition of global experience in the genre of musical theatre from their foreign colleagues; provide artists with the opportunities to participate in creative workshops by leading Broadway directors, actors, choreographers; organize seminars and round tables dedicated to exploring the issues in Russian and international musical theater.

2014 — the MDM Theater was renovated during the preparation for mounting The Phantom of the Opera musical. The number of seats increased to 1830, which made MDM into Moscow’s highest capacity modern theater of European level.

2014 — Dmitry Bogachev became the first international member of the Broadway League.

According to the official  RBC rating in 2015, Stage Entertainment Russia under Dmitry Bogachev’s management became the box office leader in the entertainment industry in Russia.

2015 — Dmitry Bogachev became the initiator and creator of the Musical Theatre Walk of Fame on Pushkin Square in Moscow. The Musical Theatre Walk of Fame was unveiled on September 6, 2015 during a gala concert "Moscow Broadway"

In 2016 — An open lecture of a legendary Broadway director Harold Prince took place as part of Broadway Moscow educational program for Russian theatre community. In addition, a non-profit organization The Broadway Dreams Foundation held the creative 10-day workshop "Broadway Dreams", culminating in a concert-revue, performed by more than 100 professional and novice Russian and American artists.

May 2016 — the World Premiere of "Anastasia" at Hartford Stages, Hartford, Connecticut.

April 2017 — the Broadway Premiere of "Anastasia" at Broadhurst, New York, New York.

2018 — The company of Dmitry Bogachev gets the new name — Broadway Moscow Ltd. MDM Theatre and Fancy Show LLC become key partners of Broadway Moscow. In August 2018 Moscow Broadway theatre company moves its headquarters and productions to the MDM Theatre. In October 2018 Broadway Moscow theatre company presented The Play That Goes Wrong — the first straight play in history of Russian theatre to run on a daily basis.

September 24, 2019 — the premiere of the original Russian production of the Broadway musical First Date took place in a site-specific format, which is unusual for Russian musical theater.

October 5, 2019 — the premiere of the play The Comedy About a Bank Robbery, another comedy hit by Mischief Theatre, took place.

September 19, 2020 — the musical Lover's Day, was opened in the MDM Parquet Hall, commissioned by Dmitry Bogachev, specially for the Broadway Moscow theatre company.

October 17, 2020 — the MDM Theatre hosted the premiere of the original Russian production of the legendary musical "Chess". The show played 600 performances and was seen by more than 700 000 spectators. The production won 3 Golden Mask awards.

December 3, 2022 — New original production "Fear Nothing, I’m With You", based on hit songs by rock band "Secret" premiered in MDM Theatre.

Productions 

2001–2002 — musical "Nord Ost"

2003–2004 — musical "12 chairs"

2005–2006 — musical  CATS

2006 — ice-skating show "Peter Pan on Ice"

2006 — ice-skating show "Fantasy"

2006–2008 — musical MAMMA MIA!

2006 — ice-skating show "Bugs Bunny on ice"

2008 — ice-skating show "Love story"

2008–2010 — Disney musical "Beauty and the Beast"

2008–2009 — ice-skating show "Peter Pan on ice"

2009–2010 — arena musical on ice "Nutcracker"

2010–2011 — musical ZORRO

2010 — arena musical on ice "Snow Queen"

2011–2012 — musical The Sound of Music

2011 — arena musical on ice "Sleeping Beauty"

2012–2014 — Disney musical "The Little Mermaid"

2012–2013 — musical MAMMA MIA!

2012 — arena musical on ice "The three musketeers"

2013–2014 — musical CHICAGO

2013 — arena musical on ice "The Wizard of OZ"

2014 — musical "The Phantom of the Opera"

2014 — Disney musical "Beauty and the Beast"

2014 — arena musical on ice "Aladdin and the Lord of Fire"

2015 — musical "Singin’ in the rain"

2015 — arena musical on ice "Sindbad and Princess Anna"

2016 — musicals "Cinderella" и "Dance of Vampires"

2017 — musical "Anastasia" on Broadway

2017 — musical "Ghost"

2018 — "The Play That Goes Wrong"

2019 — "The Comedy About a Bank Robbery"

2019 — musical "First Date"

2020 — musical "Chess"

2020 — musical "Lover’s Day"

2022 — musical "Fear Nothing, I’m With You"

Achievements and awards 

2002 — Nord-Ost musical won the National Theater Award "Golden Mask" as the best show in category Musical/Operetta 2002

2005 — EFFIE Award was given for the best brand in entertainment industry — musical CATS

2007 — Winner of the National Theater Award "Music Heart of Theater" — the best producer

2007 — EFFIE Award was given for the best brand in entertainment industry — MAMMA MIA! Musical

2008 — MAMMA MIA! was recognized the most popular musical in Russia — the record was registered in the Russian Book of Records

2008 — MAMMA MIA! musical won the Theater Award "Ovation"

2010 — Nutcracker was recognized the most popular ice-skating musical in Russia — the record was registered in the Russian Book of Records

2014 — The Little Mermaid musical won the National Theater Award "Golden Mask" as the best show in the category Musical/Operetta

2014 — The first International Member of the Broadway League

2014 — Musical The Phantom of the Opera opened the ХХ Anniversary Ceremony of National Russian Theater Award "Golden Mask"

2016 — The National Award "Person of the Year 2015" in category "Culture"

2016 — The National Award "Brand N1 in Russia 2016" in category "Cultural Event"

2022 — "Chess" musical won 3 Golden Mask Awards

References

External links

Musical Anastasia begins World Tour

1969 births
Living people
Moscow Engineering Physics Institute alumni
Russian chief executives
Russian theatre managers and producers